Christopher Douglas Mainwaring (27 December 1965 – 1 October 2007) was an Australian rules footballer who played for the West Coast Eagles in the Australian Football League (AFL) and for the East Fremantle Football Club in the West Australian Football League (WAFL). 

Adored by young fans for his handsome appearance, Mainwaring was one of the most popular footballers of his era. At his peak, he was one of the finest wingmen in the AFL, forming a devastating midfield combination with Peter Matera in the early 1990s, but after a serious knee injury in 1997 he was never able to recapture his best form. 

After retiring in 1999, Mainwaring worked as a television presenter and sports journalist with the Seven Network and a radio presenter with Mix 94.5 before his death in 2007 from a drug overdose at the age of 41.

Football career
Mainwaring was born in the coastal Western Australian town of Geraldton, over 400 kilometres north of Perth to Hubert Mainwaring and his wife Leah (née Cripps). In his first season, he was a member of the Western Australian State of Origin team and played in a Sharks premiership team.

He was a member of the West Coast Eagles' inaugural squad in 1987. He made his debut in round three that year, against Sydney at Subiaco and afterwards only missed one game for the season. and was named their best first year player. Mainwaring played for the Eagles on the wing and contributed greatly to their success, playing in both their 1992 and 1994 premierships. The image of him leaping with joy at the conclusion of the game, despite having a broken ankle, is one of the lasting images of the Eagles' first premiership. 

Mainwaring was an All-Australian in 1991 and 1996 and has been named on the wing in the West Coast Eagles' Team of the Decade in 1996, Team20 in 2006 and East Fremantle's Team of the Century in 1997. Whilst he never won the Club Champion award at the Eagles, he finished in the top 10 eight times, including placing third in both his debut and second years in the VFL and second in 1989, 1992 and 1996.

In 1997, he suffered a knee injury, which required a knee reconstruction and this put him out of action for the rest of that season. In 1998, while he was attempting to regain form, Mainwaring spent most of the season playing for the Sharks, before making his return to the West Coast side late that year. After another season in which he was in and out of the Eagles' side (and playing for East Fremantle), Mainwaring retired from AFL football.

He wore the Eagles' number 3 guernsey, a number which had only been worn by him and Chris Judd during the Eagles' history. The club retired the number for the following three seasons, until it was revived by Eagles' draft pick Andrew Gaff in 2011.

After leaving football, Mainwaring took a job with Seven News. By 2007, he was reading the sport at the weekend, as well as reporting during the week. He also read the sport headlines during the news on Perth radio station Mix 94.5 from 5:30 to 9:00 am.
In 2005 he was a reporter for the Seven News desk.
Since 2001 he had been a member of the selection panel for the All-Australian team and the AFL Rising Star.
He was married to Rani and had two children.

Statistics

|-
|- style="background-color: #EAEAEA"
! scope="row" style="text-align:center" | 1987
|style="text-align:center;"|
| 3 || 19 || 6 || 6 || 308 || 73 || 381 || 114 || 32 || 0.3 || 0.3 || 16.2 || 3.8 || 20.1 || 6.0 || 1.7 || 5
|-
! scope="row" style="text-align:center" | 1988
|style="text-align:center;"|
| 3 || 20 || 11 || 7 || 331 || 124 || 455 || 97 || 30 || 0.6 || 0.4 || 16.6 || 6.2 || 22.8 || 4.9 || 1.5 || 13
|- style="background-color: #EAEAEA"
! scope="row" style="text-align:center" | 1989
|style="text-align:center;"|
| 3 || 20 || 3 || 23 || 340 || 140 || 480 || 95 || 29 || 0.2 || 1.2 || 17.0 || 7.0 || 24.0 || 4.8 || 1.5 || 7
|-
! scope="row" style="text-align:center" | 1990
|style="text-align:center;"|
| 3 || 21 || 7 || 15 || 331 || 148 || 479 || 91 || 38 || 0.3 || 0.7 || 15.8 || 7.0 || 22.8 || 4.3 || 1.8 || 8
|- style="background-color: #EAEAEA"
! scope="row" style="text-align:center" | 1991
|style="text-align:center;"|
| 3 || 21 || 16 || 9 || 369 || 139 || 508 || 114 || 25 || 0.8 || 0.4 || 17.6 || 6.6 || 24.2 || 5.4 || 1.2 || 6
|-
|style="text-align:center;background:#afe6ba;"|1992†
|style="text-align:center;"|
| 3 || 25 || 10 || 13 || 409 || 140 || 549 || 97 || 45 || 0.4 || 0.5 || 16.4 || 5.6 || 22.0 || 3.9 || 1.8 || 10
|- style="background-color: #EAEAEA"
! scope="row" style="text-align:center" | 1993
|style="text-align:center;"|
| 3 || 12 || 10 || 9 || 206 || 56 || 262 || 45 || 20 || 0.8 || 0.8 || 17.2 || 4.7 || 21.8 || 3.8 || 1.7 || 0
|-
|style="text-align:center;background:#afe6ba;"|1994†
|style="text-align:center;"|
| 3 || 23 || 7 || 8 || 360 || 130 || 490 || 101 || 44 || 0.3 || 0.3 || 15.7 || 5.7 || 21.3 || 4.4 || 1.9 || 6
|- style="background-color: #EAEAEA"
! scope="row" style="text-align:center" | 1995
|style="text-align:center;"|
| 3 || 9 || 1 || 6 || 131 || 47 || 178 || 36 || 18 || 0.1 || 0.7 || 14.6 || 5.2 || 19.8 || 4.0 || 2.0 || 1
|-
! scope="row" style="text-align:center" | 1996
|style="text-align:center;"|
| 3 || 22 || 12 || 11 || 351 || 114 || 465 || 94 || 41 || 0.5 || 0.5 || 16.0 || 5.2 || 21.1 || 4.3 || 1.9 || 12
|- style="background-color: #EAEAEA"
! scope="row" style="text-align:center" | 1997
|style="text-align:center;"|
| 3 || 1 || 0 || 0 || 2 || 0 || 2 || 1 || 0 || 0.0 || 0.0 || 2.0 || 0.0 || 2.0 || 1.0 || 0.0 || 0
|-
! scope="row" style="text-align:center" | 1998
|style="text-align:center;"|
| 3 || 3 || 0 || 0 || 12 || 4 || 16 || 3 || 2 || 0.0 || 0.0 || 4.0 || 1.3 || 5.3 || 1.0 || 0.7 || 0
|- style="background-color: #EAEAEA"
! scope="row" style="text-align:center" | 1999
|style="text-align:center;"|
| 3 || 5 || 1 || 1 || 53 || 14 || 67 || 16 || 6 || 0.2 || 0.2 || 10.6 || 2.8 || 13.4 || 3.2 || 1.2 || 0
|- class="sortbottom"
! colspan=3| Career
! 201
! 84
! 108
! 3203
! 1129
! 4332
! 904
! 330
! 0.4
! 0.5
! 15.9
! 5.6
! 21.6
! 4.5
! 1.6
! 68
|}

Death

Mainwaring died in the early hours of 1 October 2007 after being rushed to Sir Charles Gairdner Hospital. Police and ambulance had been called to his address earlier that night after a complaint about a man yelling in the street. After Mainwaring refused assistance from the ambulance crew, he was released to the care of a neighbour. About an hour later, emergency services were called back to the property after he had convulsions and collapsed. Mainwaring reportedly told paramedics during the first visit that he had taken ecstasy and smoked cannabis. Former Eagles player Ben Cousins spent time with Mainwaring on Sunday. According to the WA State Coroner's report, Mainwaring had a seizure and died after overdosing on cocaine, rather than several different drugs as media reports originally claimed.

Mainwaring was to compete in a celebrity kickboxing event run by the World Kickboxing Association at Challenge Stadium on 4 October 2007 for charity. He had also been invited by the AFL to hold one of the Eagles' premiership cups during the 2007 AFL Grand Final pre-game entertainment, but he cancelled in the week prior to the game, instead staying in Perth.

Mainwaring's memorial service was held on 8 October 2007 at Christ Church Grammar School, Claremont. About 1,200 people attended the service, including 300 who watched on a big screen outside the chapel. A memorial match was played between his old club and rivals Fremantle in 2008, with the Eagles winning by 25 points. His two young children, along with the Matera trio, also played in the match.
 
The West Coast Eagles retired Mainwaring's number 3 jumper for the following three seasons as a mark of respect, and the club named its Best Clubman award the Chris Mainwaring Medal in his honour. The Roberts Road wing of Subiaco Oval was named The Chris Mainwaring Wing for all West Coast Eagles home games, until the club moved its home games to the new Perth Stadium in 2018.

References

External links

 Player stats at WAFL FootyFacts
 Profile at WA Football Hall of Fame

1965 births
2007 deaths
All-Australians (AFL)
Australian radio journalists
Australian radio presenters
Drug-related deaths in Australia
Cocaine-related deaths
East Fremantle Football Club players
Seven News presenters
Australian rules footballers from Geraldton
West Australian Football Hall of Fame inductees
West Coast Eagles players
West Coast Eagles Premiership players
Western Australian State of Origin players
Two-time VFL/AFL Premiership players